Urethral meatal stenosis  is a narrowing (stenosis) of the opening of the urethra at the external meatus , thus constricting the opening through which urine leaves the body from the urinary bladder.

Symptoms and signs
 Abnormal strength and direction of urinary stream
 Visible narrow opening at the meatus in boys
 Irritation, scarring or swelling of the meatus in boys
 Discomfort with urination (dysuria and frequency)
 Incontinence (day or night)
 Bleeding (hematuria) at end of urination
 Urinary tract infections - increased susceptibility due to stricture

Causes

The protection provided by the foreskin for the glans penis and meatus has been recognized since 1915.  In the absence of the foreskin the meatus is exposed to mechanical and chemical irritation from ammoniacal diaper (nappy) that produces blister formation and ulceration of the urethral opening, which eventually gives rise to meatal stenosis (a narrowing of the opening). Meatal stenosis may also be caused by ischemia resulting from damage to the frenular artery during circumcision.

Risk factors

Frisch & Simonsen (2016) carried out a very large-scale study in Denmark, which compared the incidence of meatal stenosis in Muslim males (mostly circumcised) with the incidence of meatal stenosis in ethnic Danish males (mostly non-circumcised).  The risk of meatal stenosis in circumcised males was found to be as much 3.7 times higher than in the non-circumcised males.

Diagnosis

In males, history and physical exam is adequate to make the diagnosis. In females, VCUG (voiding cystourethrogram) is usually diagnostic. Other tests may include:
 Urine analysis
 Urine culture
 CBC, basic metabolic panel
 Renal and bladder ultrasound

Prevention

In the newborn

According to Frisch & Simonsen (2016), "the foreskin is protective against urinary stricture disease" (meatal stenosis). Frisch & Simonsen (2016) call for a "thorough reassessment of the burden of urethral troubles and other adverse outcomes after non-therapeutic circumcision of boys."

After hypospadias repair

Meir & Livne (2004) suggest that use of a broad spectrum antibiotic after hypospadias repair will "probably reduce meatal stenosis [rates]", while Jayanthi (2003) recommends the use of a modified Snodgrass hypospadias repair.

Treatment
In females, meatal stenosis can usually be treated in the physician's office using local anesthesia to numb the area and dilating (widening) the urethral opening with special instruments.

In males, it is treated by a second surgical procedure called meatotomy in which the meatus is crushed with a straight mosquito hemostat and then divided with fine-tipped scissors.  Recently, home-dilatation has been shown to be a successful treatment for most boys.

Prognosis

Most people can expect normal urination after treatment.

Incidence

Numerous studies over a long period of time clearly indicate that male circumcision contributes to the development of urethral stricture. Among circumcised males, reported incidence of meatal stricture varies. Griffiths et al. (1985) reported an incidence of 2.8 percent. Sörensen & Sörensen (1988) reported 0 percent. Cathcart et al. (2006) reported an incidence of 0.55 percent. Yegane et al. (2006) reported an incidence of 0.9 percent. Van Howe (2006) reported an incidence of 7.29 percent. In Van Howe's study, all cases of meatal stenosis were among circumcised boys. Simforoosh et al. (2010) reported an incidence of 0.55 percent. According to Emedicine (2016), the incidence of meatal stenosis runs from 9 to 20 percent. Frisch & Simonsen (2016) placed the incidence at 5 to 20 percent of circumcised boys.

References

External links 

Urethra disorders